Yovich is a surname. Notable people with the surname include:

 John Yovich (born 1959), Australian educator and veterinary doctor
 Joseph Yovich (born 1976), New Zealand cricketer
 Ursula Yovich (born 1977), Australian actress and singer

See also
Jović